Field propulsion is the concept of spacecraft propulsion where no propellant is necessary but instead momentum of the spacecraft is changed by an interaction of the spacecraft with external force fields, such as gravitational and magnetic fields from stars and planets. It is purely speculative and has not yet been demonstrated to be of practical use, or theoretically valid.

Types

Practical methods

Although not presently in wide use for space, there exist proven terrestrial examples of "Field Propulsion", in which electromagnetic fields act upon a conducting medium such as seawater or plasma for propulsion, is known as magnetohydrodynamics or MHD.  MHD is similar in operation to electric motors, however rather than using moving parts or metal conductors, fluid or plasma conductors are employed.  The EMS-1 and more recently the Yamato 1 are examples of such electromagnetic Field propulsion systems, first described in 1994. There is definitely potential to apply MHD to the space environment such as in experiments like NASA's electrodynamic tether, Lorentz Actuated Orbits, the wingless electromagnetic air vehicle, and magnetoplasmadynamic thruster (which does use propellant).

Electrohydrodynamics is another method whereby electrically charged fluids are used for propulsion and boundary layer control such as ion propulsion

Other practical methods which could be loosely considered as field propulsion include: The gravity assist trajectory, which uses planetary gravity fields and orbital momentum; Solar sails and magnetic sails use respectively the radiation pressure and solar wind for spacecraft thrust; Aerobraking uses the atmosphere of a planet to change relative velocity of a spacecraft. The last two actually involve the exchange of momentum with physical particles and are not usually expressed as an interaction with fields, but they are sometimes included as examples of field propulsion since no spacecraft propellant is required.

Speculative methods
Other concepts that have been proposed are speculative, using "frontier physics" and concepts from modern physics. So far none of these methods have been unambiguously demonstrated, much less proven practical.

The Woodward effect is based on a controversial concept of inertia and certain solutions to the equations for General Relativity. Experiments attempting to conclusively demonstrate this effect have been conducted since the 1990s.

In contrast, examples of proposals for field propulsion that rely on physics outside the present paradigms are various schemes for faster-than-light, warp drive and antigravity, and often amount to little more than catchy descriptive phrases, with no known physical basis.  Until it is shown that the conservation of energy and momentum break down under certain conditions (or scales), any such schemes worthy of discussion must rely on energy and momentum transfer to the spacecraft from some external source such as a local force field, which in turn must obtain it from still other momentum and/or energy sources in the cosmos (in order to satisfy conservation of both energy and momentum).

'Quantum Fluctuation Vector Filtering'. It has also been speculated that propulsion analogous to a solar sail, but instead using vacuum fluctuations as the energy, should be possible if a specific vector of vacuum fluctuation effects could be 'filtered'. Such a drive would not be reactionless, but would effectively 'dope' natural gravity/mass effects. Effectively filtering a vector of an omni-vector energy such as vacuum fluctuations. Various quantum gravity theories hold that vacuum fluctuations represent a field energy which produces the gravity & rest mass tensors observed in nature. So based on this proposed role of Vacuum fluctuations, such a drive should be possible if a specific vector can be selectively 'filtered'. However, since natural gravity/mass tensors are relatively subtle (compared to medium-carrying types of propulsion), strong effects would not be expected, even if the filtering were possible.

Field propulsion based on physical structure of space

This concept is based on the general relativity theory and the quantum field theory from which the idea that space has a physical structure can be proposed. The macroscopic structure is described by the general relativity theory and the microscopic structure by the quantum field theory.
The idea is to deform space around the space craft. By deforming the space it would be possible to create a region with higher pressure behind the space craft than before it. Due to the pressure gradient a force would be exerted on the space craft which in turn creates thrust for propulsion. Due to the purely theoretical nature of this propulsion concept it is hard to determine the amount of thrust and the maximum velocity that could be achieved. Currently there are two different concepts for such a field propulsion system one that is purely based on the general relativity theory and one based on the quantum field theory.

In the general relativistic field propulsion system space is considered to be an elastic field similar to rubber which means that space itself can be treated as an infinite elastic body. If the space-time curves, a normal inwards surface stress is generated which serves as a pressure field. By creating a great number of those curve surfaces behind the space craft it is possible to achieve a unidirectional surface force which can be use for the acceleration of the space craft.

For the quantum field theoretical propulsion system it is assumed, as stated by the quantum field theory and quantum Electrodynamics, that the quantum vacuum consists out of a zero-radiating electromagnetic field in a non-radiating mode and at a zero-point energy state, the lowest possible energy state. It is also theorized that matter is composed out of elementary primary charged entities, partons, which are bound together as elementary oscillators. By applying an electromagnetic zero point field a Lorentz force is applied on the partons. Using this on a dielectric material could affect the inertia of the mass and that way create an acceleration of the material without creating stress or strain inside the material.

Conservation Laws
Conservation of momentum is a fundamental requirement of propulsion systems because in experiments momentum is always conserved,. This conservation law is implicit in the published work of Newton and Galileo, but arises on a fundamental level from the spatial translation symmetry of the laws of physics, as given by Noether's theorem.  In each of the propulsion technologies, some form of energy exchange is required with momentum directed backward at the speed of light 'c' or some lesser velocity 'v' to balance the forward change of momentum. In absence of interaction with an external field, the power 'P' that is required to create a thrust force 'F' is given by  when mass is ejected or  if mass-free energy is ejected.

For a photon rocket the efficiency is too small to be competitive. Other technologies may have better efficiency if the ejection velocity is less than speed of light, or a local field can interact with another large scale field of the same type residing in space, which is the intent of field effect propulsion.

Advantages
The main advantage of a field propulsion systems is that no propellant is needed, only an energy source. This means that no propellant has to be stored and transported with the space craft which makes it attractive for long term interplanetary or even interstellar manned missions. With current technology a large amount of fuel meant for the way back has to be brought to the destination which increases the payload of the overall space craft significantly.  The increased payload of fuel, thus requires more force to accelerate it, requiring even more fuel which is the primary drawback of current rocket technology.  Approximately 83% of a Hydrogen-Oxygen powered rocket, which can achieve orbit, is fuel.

Limits
The idea that with field propulsion no fuel tank would be required is technically inaccurate. The energy required to reach the high speeds involved begins to be non-neglectable for interstellar travel. For example, a 1-tonne spaceship traveling at 1/10 of the speed of light carries a kinetic energy of 4.5 × 1017 joules, equal to 5 kg according to the mass–energy equivalence. This means that for accelerating to such speed, no matter how this is achieved, the spaceship must have converted at least 5 kg of mass/energy into momentum, imagining 100% efficiency. Although such mass has not been "expelled" it has still been "disposed".

See also

References

External links
Examples of current field propulsion systems for ships. 
Example of a possible field propulsion system based on existing physics and links to papers on the topic. broken link

Y. Minami., An Introduction to Concepts of Field Propulsion, JBIS,56,350-359(2003).
Minami Y., Musha T., Field Propulsion Systems for Space Travel, the Seventh IAA Symposium on Realistic Near-Term Advanced Scientific Space Missions, 11–13 July 2011, Aosta, Italy
Ed.T.Musha, Y.Minami, Field Propulsion System for Space Travel: Physics of Non-Conventional Propulsion Methods for Interstellar Travel, 2011 .
Field Resonance Propulsion Concept - NASA
ASPS

Spacecraft propulsion
Science fiction themes
Hypothetical technology